The Forum Minority Research Institute or Forum Institute (Fórum Kisebbségkutató Intézet or Fórum Intézet in Hungarian and Fórum inštitút pre výskum menšín or Fórum inštitút in Slovak) is a Slovak think tank with its main focus on ethnic minorities living in Slovakia, especially Hungarians. The NGO's scope of activities are the study and documenting of ethnic minorities, publishing these findings and the keeping of a database of historical documents and photographs. It also speaks out on government policy-making on a regular basis, especially when the policies affects the minorities in a negative way, which sometimes triggers criticism from Slovak nationalists.

History 
The institute was founded in 1996 by the Katedra Foundation and the Forum Foundation in Dunajská Streda. In 1999, two partner institutes were founded: the Forum Information Centre provides civil training and civil service, while the Forum Regional Development Centre is engaged with rural development and small area planning. Together with the Forum Minority Research Institute, these three organizations form a consortium, the Forum Institute. In 2002 the Forum Institute moved to Šamorín, where it resides up to this day. The president of the Institute is political analyst László Öllös.

References 

1996 establishments in Slovakia
Think tanks established in 1996
Think tanks based in Slovakia
Ethnic groups in Slovakia